Cho Jin-woong (born Jo Won-jun; March 3, 1976) is a South Korean actor. He is best known for his roles as Sejong's loyal bodyguard in Deep Rooted Tree (2011), a mobster in Nameless Gangster: Rules of the Time (2012), and a mysterious villain in A Hard Day (2014). He also gained recognition and praise for his performance as a detective in the television series Signal (2016).

Filmography

Film

Television series

Television shows

Web shows

Musical/Theater

Awards and nominations

Accolades

In 2021 he was selected as Jury member for Actor and Actress of the Year Award in 26th Busan International Film Festival held in October.

References

External links
 
 
 

1976 births
Living people
Kyungsung University alumni
People from Busan
South Korean male film actors
South Korean male television actors
South Korean male stage actors
21st-century South Korean male actors